Anna Mazhirina (born 28 March 1983) is a Russian professional pool, snooker and billiards player. Mazhirina is a former Russian Billiards world champion, winning the event in 2005 and 2006. In addition, she is a multiple time finalist at European championships in Billiards, Snooker and pool. She won the European championships in Billiards in 2004, 2005.

Career
Mazhirina is twice a runner-up at the EBSA European Snooker Championship, losing in the singles in 2009, and in the team event in 2011. Mazhirina also reached the final of the European Pool Championships in 2012 in the straight pool event.

Mazhirina is a two-time winner of events on the Euro Tour, winning the 2013 Austria and Luxembourg Opens. Mazhirina would reach Euro Tour number one after her second win in 2013.

Achievements

Russian Billiards

Euro Tour (Pool)

Snooker

References

External links

Living people
1983 births
Sportspeople from Moscow
Female pool players
Female snooker players
Russian pool players
Russian snooker players